The Saratoga Oaks Invitational Stakes is a Grade III American Thoroughbred horse race for three-year-old fillies and older run over a distance of one and three-sixteenths miles on the turf held annually in August at Saratoga Race Course in Saratoga Springs, New York.

History

In 2019 the New York Racing Association with the influx of racino dollars created a new racing series for three year old fillies called the Turf Tiara. The Saratoga Oaks Invitational Stakes was positioned as the second leg of the new three race series. The other events of the Turf Tiara are the Belmont Oaks and the Jockey Club Oaks at Belmont Park.

The event's inaugural running was on 2 August 2019 and was won by Ashbrook Farm & BBN Racing's Concrete Rose who was ridden by jockey Julien R. Leparoux and trained by  trainer George Arnold II comfortably leading all the way by  lengths as the 3/10 odds on favorite by a head in a time of 1:55.34. Concrete Rose was injured soon after and was retired after winning six of her seven lifetime starts.

In 2021 the event was upgraded in classification by the Thoroughbred Owners and Breeders Association's American Graded Stakes Committee to Grade III.

Records
Speed record:
 miles: 1:53.30 Antoinette   (2020)

Margins:
 lengths – Concrete Rose  (2019)

Most wins by an owner:
 2 – Godolphin Racing (2020, 2022)

Most wins by a jockey:
 No jockey has won the event more than once

Most wins by a trainer:
 No trainer has won the event more than once

Winners 

Legend:

See also
 List of American and Canadian Graded races

References

Graded stakes races in the United States
Grade 3 stakes races in the United States
2019 establishments in New York (state)
Flat horse races for three-year-old fillies
Horse races in New York (state)
Turf races in the United States
Recurring sporting events established in 2019
Saratoga Race Course